Tarquin's Seaweed Farm, subtitled "Words from a Hessian Sack", is the first album to be released by Steven Wilson under the pseudonym Porcupine Tree. It was originally a compiled cassette of experimental music made by Steven Wilson for his joke band he formed with his friend Malcom Stocks. The cassette was only sent out to a few people, but was enough to give the band a bit of fame in the UK underground music scene of the time, being picked up by the underground magazine Freakbeat. It was later released under Delerium Records in 1991 in a limited edition of 300 copies.

Tracks 1 to 7, and a re-recorded version of "Radioactive Toy", would be released on the band's first studio album, On the Sunday of Life.... The song "Nun's Cleavage (Left)", however, was renamed "Third Eye Surfer", with songs "Clarinet Vignette" and "Nun's Cleavage (Right)" being indexed as one track called "On the Sunday of Life". The rest of the tracks, including the original version of "Radioactive Toy", would be released on compilation album Yellow Hedgerow Dreamscape. A different instrumental version of the track "Yellow Hedgerow Dreamscape" would be released on the Stairscase Infinities EP.

According to the liner notes of the 2000 vinyl reissue of Yellow Hedgerow Dreamscape. some of the songs on Tarquin's Seaweed Farm can be dated back to 1986.

In 2004, the album and the other two Delerium cassettes (Love, Death & Mussolini and The Nostalgia Factory) were privately remixed and remastered by Steven Wilson and rereleased in a special boxset called "Footprints: Cassette Music 1988–1992". 25 copies were made and distributed to friends and family of Wilson, who also kept a copy for himself and sent some to the rest of the band.

Track listing
(All tracks written by Steven Wilson except "Jupiter Island" written by Wilson/Duffy, "Clarinet Vignette" written by Wilson/Masters and "The Cross" written by Prince. Artwork by Alistair Campbell.)

Side A ("Studio LP")
"Music for the Head (Here)" – 2:44
"Jupiter Island" – 6:09
"Nun's Cleavage (Left)" – 2:45
"Clarinet Vignette" – 1:18
"Nun's Cleavage (Right)" – 1:09
"Space Transmission" – 2:56
"Message from a Self-Destructing Turnip" –  0:28
"Radioactive Toy" – 5:49
"Towel" – 3:33
"Wastecoat" – 1:10
"Mute (Part 1, Part 2, Part 3)" – 8:06
"Music for the Head (There)" – 1:24

Side B ("Live LP")
"No Reason to Live, No Reason to Die" – 11:09
"Daughters in Excess" – 6:46
"The Cross" – 2:16
"Hole" – 7:35
"Yellow Hedgerow Dreamscape" – 10:48

Credits (fiction)

Tripping Musicians Extraordinaire:
 The Porcupine Tree – Acoustic Guitar, Electric Guitar, Flute, Koto and Vocals
 Sir Tarquin Underspoon – Organ, Electric Piano, Synthesisers and Vocals
 Mr Jelly – Bass Guitar
 The Expanding Flan – Drums, Percussion, Drum Computer and Spoken Word
 Timothy Tadpole-Jones – Acoustic Guitar, Percussion
 Sebastian Tweetle-Blampton III operates the delay circuits and mixing desk
 Solomon St. Jemain – Guitar on 'Wastecoat', Drum Computer on 'Towel' and Spoken Word
 Master Timothy Masters – Oboe, Cor Anglais
 Linton Samuel Dawson operates the light show

References

Porcupine Tree albums
1989 albums